Reuben Bizarwenda Kisembo  is an Anglican bishop in Uganda: he has been Bishop of Rwenzori since 2011.

References

Anglican bishops of Rwenzori
Uganda Christian University alumni
21st-century Anglican bishops in Uganda
Living people
Year of birth missing (living people)